James Sandlak, Jr. (born December 12, 1966) is a Canadian former professional ice hockey player who spent 11 seasons in the National Hockey League and was known as "the House" due to his large stature.

Playing career
Sandlak played major junior with the London Knights of the Ontario Hockey League (OHL). Heading into the 1985 NHL Entry Draft he was regarded as one of the top-rated players for the draft. He was selected by the Vancouver Canucks with the fourth overall pick; at 6'4" and 220 lbs he was chosen to address the Canucks' desire for a big scoring forward. He confirmed this status with a dominant performance at the 1986 World Junior Championships, at which he was the captain of the Canadian team and was named the tournament's top forward. Convinced that Sandlak was a better prospect than the slow-developing Cam Neely (who played the same position and style), Canuck management decided that Neely was expendable, and dealt him to the Boston Bruins for Barry Pederson in what would later be labelled by many commentators as one of the worst trades ever made.

Sandlak had a solid rookie year in 1986–87, scoring 15 goals and being selected to the NHL All-Rookie Team. After a poor training camp in 1987, he was sent to the AHL, but responded well upon his recall, scoring 16 goals in 49 games. He scored 20 goals the following season, but continued to struggle with comparisons to the superstar Neely and frustrate fans and management alike with his inconsistency. By the 1990–91 season he was getting less ice time on the Canucks, scoring just 7 goals.

However, Sandlak rebounded in 1991–92 to play the best hockey of his career on a rejuvenated Canuck team. Playing largely with Sergio Momesso and Cliff Ronning (a line dubbed the "Twin Towers" due to Ronning's small stature accentuating the size of his two larger linemates), Sandlak matched his career high of 40 points despite missing almost 20 games due to injury. In the 1992 playoffs, Sandlak finally put his game together and looked like the power forward he was always supposed to be, as he was arguably the best player in Vancouver's opening-round victory against Winnipeg, and contributed 10 points in that playoffs while playing a dominant physical game.

However, just as Sandlak's career appeared headed in the right direction, injuries began to take their toll. His 1992–93 season was plagued by back problems which caused him to miss 25 games as well as most of the playoffs, and limited him to just 10 goals. Following the season, he was dealt to the Hartford Whalers as the future considerations in the Murray Craven trade. His two seasons with the Whalers were an absolute nightmare, however, as wrist, foot, knee, and heel injuries limited him to just 40 games and 8 points over that span. Released by the Whalers in 1995, he returned to Vancouver for the 1995–96 season, but again struggled with injuries (this time a stress fracture to a vertebra in his back) and his level of play had dropped off considerably. Following a failed tryout with Buffalo the following season he retired from the NHL, although he returned after a year off for a season in Germany before leaving the game for good.

Sandlak finished his career with totals of 110 goals and 229 points in 549 career games, along with 821 penalty minutes.  According to a 2006 issue of The Hockey News, Sandlak retired to London, Ontario where he owns and operates a landscaping company.  He also coaches youth hockey in the London Knights system. He has two sons named Carter and Patrick. Patrick is at university and plays football. Carter played in the OHL from 2009 until 2014, and is playing in the NHL for the Carolina Hurricanes in the 2014-15 season.

Awards and achievements
 Named top forward at the 1986 World Junior Ice Hockey Championships
 Won silver medal at 1986 World Junior Championships
 Named to 1986–87 NHL All-Rookie Team

Career statistics

Regular season and playoffs

International

Coaching
Sandlak was an assistant coach with the Sarnia Sting of the OHL in 2007-2008.

References

External links

1966 births
Anaheim Ducks scouts
Hartford Whalers players
Ice hockey people from Ontario
Kitchener Rangers players
Living people
London Knights players
National Hockey League first-round draft picks
Sportspeople from Kitchener, Ontario
Syracuse Crunch players
Vancouver Canucks draft picks
Vancouver Canucks players
Canadian ice hockey right wingers